Hatsumi (written: 初恋, 初美, 初見) is both a Japanese surname and a feminine Japanese given name.

Notable people with the surname include:

, Japanese ninjutsu practitioner
, Japanese pornographic film actress

Notable people with the given include:

, Japanese singer
, Japanese shogi player

Japanese feminine given names
Japanese-language surnames